Chisamba, often misspelled as Chifamba, is a small town located near Chibombo, in the Central Province of Zambia. In February 2013 a bus crash killed 53 people near Chisamba. The Protea Hotel Safari Lodge Hotel is located in Chisamba.

Chisamba, once part of Chibombo District, is now its own district. The town lies just off the Great North Road between Lusaka and Kabwe.

References

Populated places in Central Province, Zambia